Simone Sabbioni (born 3 October 1996) is an Italian competitive swimmer and two-time Olympian who competed at the 2016 Olympics and the 2020 Olympics. He is a former Italian record holder in the short course 50 metre backstroke, 100 metre backstroke, 200 metre backstroke, 4×50 metre medley relay and the long course 100 metre backstroke.

International career

2014–2015
At the 2014 Summer Youth Olympics, in Nanjing, China in August 2014, Sabbioni won a gold medal in the 100 metre backstroke along with Evgeny Rylov of Russia as they both swam the exact same time of 54.24 seconds in the final. On 14 April 2015, at the year's Italian Spring National Championships in Riccione, he broke the national record in the long course 100 metre backstroke with his time of 53.49, which lowered the record over two tenths of a seconds from the prior record of 53.77 seconds set in 2009 by Mirco Di Tora.

2015 European Short Course Championships
In early December, at the 2015 European Short Course Swimming Championships in Netanya, Israel, Sabbioni set Italian national records in all three distances of the short course backstroke events, including two records in the 50 metre backstroke of 23.23 seconds in the semifinals and 23.09 seconds in the final, a record of 50.57 seconds in the 100 metre backstroke, and a record of 1:50.75 in the 200 metre backstroke. He also helped set an Italian record at 1:31.71 in the 4×50 metre medley relay. Later in the month, at the 2015 Italian Winter National Championships, he swam a 53.37 in the 100 metre backstroke, setting a new Italian national record in the event.

2016–2017
In April 2016, at the Italian Spring National Championships for the year in Riccione, Sabbioni broke his former national record of 53.37 seconds in the 100 metre backstroke with his new time of 53.34 seconds. The following month, he won a bronze medal at the 2016 European Aquatics Championships in London, England, in the 100 metre backstroke with a time of 54.19 seconds.

2017 Winter National Championships
At the short course 2017 Italian Winter National Championships in early December, Sabbioni lowered his Italian records in the 100 metre backstroke, from a 50.57 to a 49.96, and the 50 metre backstroke, from a 23.09 to a 23.06.

2017 European Short Course Championships

Later in December, at the 2017 European Short Course Swimming Championships in Copenhagen, Denmark, Sabbioni broke his own national record in the 100 metre backstroke again, lowering the mark to 49.68 seconds and winning the silver medal in the event. For the 50 metre backstroke, Sabbioni lowered his national record of 23.06 from earlier in the month by one hundredth of a second to 23.05 in the final, winning the gold medal in the event and finishing two hundredths of a second ahead of Kliment Kolesnikov of Russia who won the silver medal. Speaking to LEN about the race, Sabbioni said, "Before the race I got really angry. This is the feeling you need to win the 50m. It gives you the power, the strength, the speed. I felt my legs after the turns but anger took over again and it lifted my spirit enough to win this race." In addition to his gold medal and silver medal in individual events, Sabbioni also won a silver medal in the 4×50 meter medley relay, helping the relay finish in a total time of 1:31.91 with his split time of 23.14 seconds for the backstroke leg of the relay.

2018–2019

2018 World Short Course Championships
At the 2018 World Short Course Championships held in Hangzhou, China in December, Sabbioni competed on the finals relay of the 4×50 metre medley relay, helping the relay achieve a time of 1:31.54, set a new Italian record in the event, and place fourth overall.

2019 World Championships

At the 2019 World Aquatics Championships in Gwangju, South Korea in July 2019, Sabbioni competed in the 50 metre backstroke, 100 metre backstroke, mixed 4×100 metre medley relay, and 4×100 metre medley relay. Sabbioni was one of two swimmers, the other being Dylan Carter of Trinidad and Tobago, to have wedge equipment malfunction during his backstroke start in the 100 metre backstroke, and the only swimmer to have the technology fail a second time after officials assured him nothing would happen, this story was picked up and covered by newspapers The Seattle Times and The Korea Herald. As officials ruled it was equipment failure on the wedge malfunction each time, Sabbioni was allowed to re-race the event until the equipment worked, at which point he swam a 53.85 for his time in the prelims heats and advanced to the semifinals. In the semifinals, Sabbioni finished with a time of 53.71 seconds, tied for 12th overall with Daniel Martin of Romania, and did not advance to the final of the event.

2021

2020 Summer Olympics

At the 2020 Summer Olympics in Tokyo, Japan in 2021, Sabbioni ranked 17th in the 100 metre backstroke with a time of 53.79 and competed in the first ever swimming of the 4×100 metre mixed medley relay event at the Olympic Games, which was the preliminaries of the event on 29 July, where he swam the backstroke leg of the relay and helped qualify for the final ranking fifth overall, where the finals relay went on to place fourth.

2021 European Short Course Championships
Sabbioni was one of a total of 40 swimmers named to the Italian team in October 2021 to compete at the 2021 European Short Course Swimming Championships held in November at the Kazan Aquatics Palace located in Kazan, Russia. He went for depth with his events for the Championships, entering to compete in all available distances in backstroke, the 50 metre backstroke, 100 metre backstroke, and 200 metre backstroke. On the first day of competition, 2 November, he placed third in his prelims heat of the 50 metre backstroke with a time of 23.50 seconds and did not advance to the semifinals. While his time was faster than some of the swimmers who qualified for the semifinals, including Kristóf Milák of Hungary in the same prelims heat, only the fastest two Italian swimmers advanced, which did not include Sabbioni. The same day he was officially withdrawn from the 200 metre backstroke, opting not to race the event. In the prelims heats of the 100-metre backstroke on the third day of competition, Sabbioni swam a 51.98 and did not advance to the semifinals.

International championships (50 m)

 Sabbioni swam only in the preliminaries.

International championships (25 m)

 Sabbioni swam only in the preliminaries.

Personal best times

Short course metres (25 m pool)

Legend: NR – Italian record

National records

Long course metres (50 m pool)

Short course metres (25 m pool)

References

External links
 

Living people
Italian male swimmers
Italian male backstroke swimmers
Male medley swimmers
Medalists at the FINA World Swimming Championships (25 m)
European Aquatics Championships medalists in swimming
Swimmers at the 2014 Summer Youth Olympics
1996 births
Swimmers at the 2016 Summer Olympics
Swimmers at the 2020 Summer Olympics
Olympic swimmers of Italy
Mediterranean Games gold medalists for Italy
Mediterranean Games silver medalists for Italy
Mediterranean Games medalists in swimming
Swimmers at the 2018 Mediterranean Games
Youth Olympic gold medalists for Italy
21st-century Italian people
Sportspeople from Rimini